Ravasio is a surname. Notable people with the surname include:

Eugenia Ravasio (1907–1990), Italian Roman Catholic nun, visionary, and mystic
Mario Ravasio (born 1998), Italian footballer

See also
Ravasi

Italian-language surnames